Shudder to Think was an American alternative rock band. Formed in 1986, they released three albums on the Washington, D.C.-based label Dischord Records, and two on Epic Records. Their early work was largely influenced by post-hardcore although they gradually drew upon a wide range of stylistic influences, including pop music and glam metal.

History
The band's first lineup was Craig Wedren (vocals and guitar), Chris Matthews (guitar), Stuart Hill (bass) and Mike Russell (drums).  In this incarnation, the band released one song on the Fetal Records compilation F-R-5 in 1987 ("Too little, too late"), two singles and one album (Curse, Spells, Voodoo, Mooses, 1989) before being signed by the Dischord label. Three albums were then released (Ten-Spot, 1990, Funeral at the Movies, 1991, and Get Your Goat, 1992), before the band gained greater exposure by touring with Fugazi and the Smashing Pumpkins; with their May 7, 1992 show in Albig, Germany being released by Tobby Holzinger as Your Choice Live Series Vol.21.

Swiz ex-bassist Nathan Larson (guitars) and ex-Jawbox drummer Adam Wade replaced Matthews and Russell in 1992. Matthews and Russell last performed live with the band on January 1, 1992 and June 28, 1992 respectively, as announced by Wedren to the crowd during those concerts.

The band subsequently signed to Epic, with whom Pony Express Record was released in 1994. The album's angular, mathematical post-hardcore earned it a devoted cult following - especially after the video for the track "X-French Tee Shirt" became a buzz clip on MTV and was regularly aired on the channel, as well as an article in Rolling Stone.  The track also peaked at #36 on the Radio and Records Alternative chart.

Over the next few years, Wedren successfully battled Hodgkin's Disease, Larson recorded an album with side project band Mind Science of the Mind, and Wade left the group. He was replaced by Kevin March, formerly drummer with Dambuilders.

They released another album, 50,000 B.C., in 1997. The band also worked on music for soundtracks including First Love, Last Rites and High Art. In 1998, the band wrote and performed two songs for the film Velvet Goldmine.

However, 1998 marked Larson's departure and the end of the group. Wedren has pursued a solo career, including an appearance on the Down to You soundtrack with "Didn't Mean to Do You Harm", and contributed backing vocals to Verve Pipe's 1999 eponymous album.

Both Larson and Wedren have gone on to create highly regarded music for films. David Wain, founder of comedy troupe The State, was a high-school friend of Wedren's, and Wedren's music has appeared in many television series and films stemming from the troupe and its alumni, such as Reno 911! and Wet Hot American Summer. Wedren also makes solo music, and released his debut album, Lapland, in 2005. Larson has formed a new band called Hot One.

Reunions
Wedren, Larson, and March performed a brief set together on September 17, 2007, at The Mercury Lounge in New York City. The band continued to perform shows throughout 2008 and 2009 with March playing the eastern dates and Wade on the western dates. The band released a live album entitled Live from Home in 2009. Without Larson, the band played what was billed as a "final" show on September 2, 2009, at the Bowery Ballroom in New York City.

Shudder to Think reunited again in 2013 for the 20th anniversary of the Black Cat venue. In addition to a full set by the Pony Express Record lineup of Wedren, Larson, Wade and Hill, earlier members Chris Matthews and Mike Russell performed on the encore.

Influence on other bands
Shudder to Think has been listed as an influence by other bands - Incubus went as far as covering part of "X-French Tee Shirt" in their song "Nowhere Fast" during Lollapalooza in 2003. Jeff Buckley also listed Shudder to Think as a favorite band of his. In 1998 Pearl Jam invited Shudder to Think to open for them on a tour of Australia and even played a snippet of the Shudder song "Pebbles" during their set. Deftones have cited Shudder to Think as an influence and have even covered bits of "X-French Tee Shirt" and "So Into You" at live shows. Cursive mentions the band in their song "Sink to the Beat" off their EP, Burst and Bloom.

Musical style
The band, which has been classified as post-hardcore, embraced "pop influences and a skewed sense of songwriting" while coming from a hardcore punk background "courtesy of their affiliation" with Dischord. Reviewer Charles Spano characterized some of the band's work as the result of the group skewing "their pop brilliance with Ric Ocasek grooves, a [David] Bowie and [...] Roxy Music glam bent [...], and the theatrics of Queen."

In the 2018 book Long Live Queen, when DJ/VJ Matt Pinfield was asked if Queen was an influence on 1990s alt-rock, he replied:"Look at a band like Shudder to Think and a song like 'X-French Tee Shirt,' which was such a great song, because [the middle part] was one note, and he was singing two octaves over that."

In an interview from 1995, James Iha of The Smashing Pumpkins praised the band's originality, saying: "Shudder to Think, I think, is a wholly original, amazing rock band. They're a rock band but they're totally different than what you've heard before in the guitar playing, the drumming, the bass, singing, it's all amazing. If you listen to a Shudder to Think record, you might be able to point to a few references but there's no way you could tag that band. And they're good, they write good songs. They're totally original."

Band members
Craig Wedren - lead vocals & guitar (1986–1998, 2007–2009)
Stuart Hill - bass (1986–1998)
Chris Matthews - guitar (1986–1992)
Mike Russell - drums (1986–1992)
Nathan Larson - guitar (1992–1998, 2007–2008)
Adam Wade - drums (1992–1996, 2008-2013)
Kevin March - drums (1996–1998, 2007–2009)
Mark Watrous - guitar (2007–2009)
Jesse Krakow - bass (2007–2009)

Discography

Albums
Curses, Spells, Voodoo, Mooses (1988, Sammich Records)
Ten Spot (1990, Dischord Records)
Funeral at the Movies (1991, Dischord Records)
Get Your Goat (1992, Dischord Records)
Pony Express Record (1994, Epic)
50,000 B.C. (1997, Epic)

Live albums
Your Choice Live Series (1992, Your Choice Records)
Live from Home (2009, Team Love)

Demo EP
Shudder To Think (1994, Epic ESK5691)

Singles
 It Was Arson (1988, Sammich)
 Medusa Seven (1989, Hoss)
 Catch of the Day (1990, Trout, split w/ Unrest)
 Hit Liquor / No Room 9, Kentucky 7" (1992, Dischord)
 Hit Liquor (1994, Epic)
 X - French T-Shirt / Shake Your Halo Down 7" (1994, Sub Pop)
 S/T (Live) (1994, Epic)
 So Into You (1995, Epic)
 Red House (1997, Epic)

Soundtracks
 First Love, Last Rites soundtrack (et al.) 1998
 High Art soundtrack (et al.) 1999
 Velvet Goldmine soundtrack 1998

Compilations
F-R-5 (A compilation album)* - 1987 Fetal Records #005
State of the Union: D.C. Benefit Compilation* - 1989 Dischord Records
Funeral at the Movies/Ten Spot
O Come All Ye Faithful (Rock for Choice) - 1996

References

American post-hardcore musical groups
Dischord Records artists
Alternative rock groups from Washington, D.C.
Indie rock musical groups from Washington, D.C.
Epic Records artists
Musical groups established in 1986
Musical groups disestablished in 1998
Musical groups reestablished in 2007
Musical groups disestablished in 2009